Christian Science Society, also called the Christian Science Society Building, is an historic single storey style Christian Science church edifice located at 20 Chapel Street in Nanaimo, British Columbia, Canada. It was built between 1900 and 1910 as a single-family house and was known as the McDonald Property. In 1932 it was converted to church use by being placed on a concrete foundation and having its exterior stuccoed while the interior was gutted and remodeled for its new use. Citing the building as a "good example of early adaptive re-use" and '"very good example of Classical Period Revival architecture", albeit "a very modest rendition of the style", the city designated it a local heritage site on October 7, 2002.

Christian Science Society is still an active congregation listed in the Christian Science Journal.

References

See also
 List of national historic sites of Canada

Christian Science churches in Canada
Churches in British Columbia
Buildings and structures in Nanaimo
Heritage sites in British Columbia